Serdar Aziz (born 23 October 1990) is a Turkish professional footballer who plays as a centre back for Süper Lig club Fenerbahçe.

Early years
Aziz was born in Osmangazi, Bursa. His father was born in Bitola, North Macedonia of Turkish descent and his mother was born in Bursa. He has two older siblings, one brother and one sister. Aziz's father was an amateur footballer in Bursa.
At the age of 10, Aziz enrolled in a football school in Bursa. He spent 2 months at the school before he was signed to a youth contract by Bursaspor. Aziz originally played in midfield due to his small stature. However, Aziz pleaded his coach to place him as a center back because he believed he wasn't good enough technically to play in midfield. Aziz had a growth spurt soon after, which cemented his position at stopper.

Career
Raşit Çetiner called Aziz up to the senior squad in 2006. Although he did not make his debut, Aziz was allowed to train alongside the senior players. He was loaned to feeder club Bursa Merinosspor for the 2007–08 season. Aziz was not open to the move, but warmed up to the idea after he realized the club was virtually one and the same with Bursaspor. He admitted the physical nature of the TFF Third League helped aid his development into becoming a professional center back. Aziz made his professional debut for Bursaspor on 25 October 2008 against Fenerbahçe, with Bursaspor losing 2–5. He was a part of the Bursaspor squad that won the Süper Lig in 2009–10.

On 23 February 2018 he scored against his former club Bursaspor in a 3-0 win, after scoring he chose not to celebrate.

International career
Aziz has played for Turkey at the U-16, U-17, U-18, U-19, and U-21 levels. Aziz was a part of the U-19 squad that competed at the 2009 UEFA European Under-19 Football Championship.

Due to having some Kosovo origins, Aziz is eligible to play for the Kosovo soccer team, although he considers himself Turkish and expressed the view of playing for Turkey.

He has received call-up from Macedonia national football team, however he rejected it, stating his desire to represent Turkey at the senior level.
On 24 August 2007 he broke the leg of Norwegian player Mohammed Fellah in an U-19.

He made his debut at senior level on 16 November against Kazakhstan and in that game he scored the third goal in a 3-1 win.

Career statistics

Club

International
As of match played 8 October 2021.

International goals
Scores and results list Turkey's goal tally first.

Honours

Club
Bursaspor
Süper Lig: 2009–10

Galatasaray
Süper Lig: 2017–18
Süper Kupa: 2016

See also
Serdar Aziz: "Bursaspor'da sembol olmak istiyorum" – An extensive interview with Serdar Aziz

Notes

References

External links

1990 births
Living people
Sportspeople from Bursa
Association football central defenders
Turkish footballers
Turkey international footballers
Turkey under-21 international footballers
Turkey youth international footballers
Bursaspor footballers
Galatasaray S.K. footballers
Fenerbahçe S.K. footballers
Süper Lig players
Macedonian people of Turkish descent